Andrea Meroni (born 9 January 1997) is an Italian football player who plays for  club Cosenza.

Club career

Empoli
He spent his youth career with Empoli. He did not appear for the club's senior squad.

Loan to Cosenza
On 30 July 2016 he joined Lega Pro club Cosenza on loan.

He made his professional Lega Pro debut for Cosenza on 6 November 2016 in a game against Casertana. He started the game and played the whole match. He finished the loan with 4 appearances for Cosenza, 2 of them as a starter.

Paganese
On 28 July 2017 he signed a 3-year contract with Serie C club Paganese.

Pisa

Loan to Paganese
On 31 January 2018 his rights were acquired by Serie C club Pisa, who then loaned him back to Paganese for the remainder of the 2017–18 season.

Sassuolo

Loan to Pisa
On 31 July 2019 his rights were acquired by Serie A club Sassuolo, who then loaned him back to Pisa on a 2-year term.

Pisa was promoted to Serie B for the 2019–20 season and Meroni made his debut in the second tier on 15 September 2019 in a game against Cremonese. He started the game and played for 72 minutes before being substituted.

Loan to Cremonese
On 31 August 2021 he joined Cremonese on loan.

Return to Cosenza
On 26 July 2022, Meroni returned to Cosenza on a two-year contract.

References

External links
 

1997 births
People from Empoli
Footballers from Tuscany
Living people
Italian footballers
Association football defenders
Cosenza Calcio players
Paganese Calcio 1926 players
Pisa S.C. players
U.S. Cremonese players
Serie B players
Serie C players
Sportspeople from the Metropolitan City of Florence